Ambika Prasad Upadhyaya was a Nepalese historian. 

He is best known for writing Nepalko Itihas (1922). Upadhyaya is the first person to write the history of Nepal in the Nepali-language. Upadhyaya was married to Ambalika Devi from 1901 to 1936, till her death.

Works 

 Nepalko Itihas (1922)
 Sundar Sarojini

References 

20th-century Nepalese male writers
20th-century Nepalese historians
Historians of Nepal